Scopula preumenes is a moth of the  family Geometridae. It is found in Tibet.

References

Moths described in 1938
preumenes
Moths of Asia